This is a list of films produced by the Ollywood film industry based in Bhubaneshwar and Cuttack in 1992:

A-Z

References

1992
Ollywood
1990s in Orissa
 Olly
1992 in Indian cinema